James Andrews Grant,  (born 1937) is a Canadian lawyer.

He received a B.A. in 1958 and a Bachelor of Civil Law in 1961 from McGill University. He was called to the Bar of Quebec in 1962. He is a partner and Chairman Emeritus of the law firm, Stikeman Elliott LLP. He serves on the Board of Directors of CAE Inc. and CIBC.

In 2003, he was president of the Royal Canadian Golf Association. In 1996, he was named to the Security Intelligence Review Committee and was accordingly summoned to the Queen's Privy Council for Canada.

In 2003, he was made a Member of the Order of Canada.

In 2009, he was awarded the James A. Robb Award by the McGill University Faculty of Law.

References 

1937 births
Canadian King's Counsel
Directors of the Canadian Imperial Bank of Commerce
Lawyers from Montreal
Living people
McGill University alumni
McGill University Faculty of Law alumni
Members of the Order of Canada
Members of the King's Privy Council for Canada